CA77.1 (CA) is a synthetic compound that activates chaperone-mediated autophagy (CMA) by increasing the expression of the lysosomal receptor for this pathway,  LAMP2A, in lysosomes. CA77.1 is a derivative of earlier compound AR7, which shows potent CMA activation in vitro but is not suitable for in vivo use. CA77.1 is able to activate CMA in vivo, and demonstrates brain penetrance and favorable pharmacokinetics.  It has been shown in animal studies that in vivo administration of CA77.1 to enhance chaperone-mediated autophagy,  may help to degrade toxic pathogenic protein products  such as tau proteins and has potential applications in the treatment of Alzheimer's disease.

References 

Chloroarenes
Quinoxalines
Acetamides
Anilines